Chillin' Island is HBO original programming based on a radio show by the same name. It premiered December 17, 2021. Hosted by Alec "Despot" Einstein, Ashak "Dap" Kondabalu, and Aleksey "Lakutis" Weintraub, the show takes place in different adventurous outdoor settings. The guests, who have included Lil Yachty and Young Thug, join in a casual conversational format.

Format 
Each unscripted episode follows Despot, Dap, and Lakutis on an outdoor excursion with a celebrity guest form hip hop culture. It is narrated by Steven Wright.

References 

HBO original programming
American television series